The 2005 UEFA Women's Championship, also referred to as UEFA Women's Euro 2005, was a football tournament for women held from 5 June to 19 June 2005 in Lancashire, England and Cheshire, England. The UEFA Women's Championship is a regular tournament involving European national teams from countries affiliated to UEFA, the European governing body, who have qualified for the competition. The competition aims to determine which national women's team is the best in Europe.

Germany won the competition for the fourth consecutive tournament, and the sixth time overall (including one win in the predecessor tournament, the European Competition for Representative Women's Teams). Their championship win was the last for coach Tina Theune-Meyer, who months earlier had announced her retirement effective at the end of the tournament. In her nine years in charge of Germany, they won three European titles, two bronze medals in the Olympics, and the 2003 World Cup.

Teams and structure
Eight national teams participated – seven of which qualified from earlier stages, plus England, which received an automatic berth as the host nation. They were split into two groups of four: Group A and Group B. Each team in a group played each other once, with the top two teams in each group progressing to the semi-finals. The winner faced the runner-up of the other group in a play-off, with the winner of each semi-final advancing to the final to determine the champion.

Group A

Group B

Qualification

A qualifying round ran from 22 March to 3 October 2004.  The teams which were entered played in a group stage, with the winners advancing to the final, and the runners-up being given the chance of qualification through a play-off. England, as the host nation, qualified automatically for the tournament. This was the first time in which the hosts qualified automatically for the final tournament.

The following teams were eliminated at this stage:

Armenia, Austria, Belarus, Belgium, Bosnia-Herzegovina, Croatia, Estonia, Greece, Hungary, Israel, Kazakhstan, Malta, Netherlands, Poland, Portugal, Republic of Ireland, Romania, Scotland, Serbia and Montenegro, Slovakia, Spain, Switzerland, Ukraine

Three teams were also eliminated in play-offs for the tournament:

Czech Republic, Iceland, Russia

More information on the qualification format at UEFA.com

Squads
For a list of all squads that played in the final tournament, see 2005 UEFA Women's Championship squads

Match officials

 Croatia
Blazenka Logarusic

 Czech Republic
Dagmar Damková
Hana Spackova

 England
Amy Rayner
Wendy Toms

 Hungary
Gyöngyi Gaál

 Northern Ireland
Andi Regan

 Poland
Katarzyna Nadolska

 Romania
Floarea Cristina Ionescu
Irina Mirt

 Slovakia
Alexandra Ihringova
Miroslava Migalova

 Spain
Yolanda Parga Rodriguez

 Switzerland
Elke Lüthi
Nicole Petignat

 United States of America
Kari Seitz

Results

First round
Top two teams in each group advanced to the semi-finals

Group A

Note:
Finland and Denmark finished level on points. Finland advanced to the semi-finals due to their head-to-head win.

Group B

Knockout stage

Semi-finals

Final

Legacy

The tournament was viewed as a successful one by the Football Association. The tournament is credited with popularising women's football in England.

Goalscorers
4 goals
  Inka Grings

3 goals

  Conny Pohlers
  Birgit Prinz
  Solveig Gulbrandsen
  Hanna Ljungberg

2 goals

  Cathrine Paaske-Sørensen
  Laura Österberg Kalmari
  Marinette Pichon
  Renate Lingor
  Melania Gabbiadini
  Isabell Herlovsen
  Lise Klaveness
  Dagny Mellgren

1 goal

  Merete Pedersen
  Johanna Rasmussen
  Amanda Barr
  Karen Carney
  Fara Williams
  Heidi Kackur
  Minna Mustonen
  Anna-Kaisa Rantanen
  Stéphanie Mugneret-Béghé
  Hoda Lattaf
  Steffi Jones
  Sandra Minnert
  Anja Mittag
  Elisa Camporese
  Sara Di Filippo
  Marit Christensen
  Anna Sjöström

Own goal
  Sanna Valkonen (playing against England)

See also
UEFA Women's Championship
UEFA
Women's football (soccer)

References

External links
Official site

 
Women
2005
2005
2005 in women's association football
2004–05 in English women's football
2004–05 in German women's football
2005 in Swedish women's football
2005 in Norwegian women's football
2004–05 in French women's football
2005 in Finnish football
2004–05 in Italian women's football
2004–05 in Danish women's football
June 2005 sports events in the United Kingdom